Alison Sunee (born 20 July 1999) is a Mauritian weightlifter. She represented Mauritius at the 2019 African Games held in Rabat, Morocco and she won the bronze medal in the women's 76kg event. She has also won several medals, including gold, at the African Weightlifting Championships.

In 2018, she competed in the women's 75 kg event at the Commonwealth Games held in Gold Coast, Australia.

References

External links 
 

Living people
1999 births
Mauritian female weightlifters
Weightlifters at the 2018 Commonwealth Games
Commonwealth Games competitors for Mauritius
African Games medalists in weightlifting
African Games bronze medalists for Mauritius
Competitors at the 2019 African Games
African Weightlifting Championships medalists